The 1948 Sam Houston State Bearkats football team represented Sam Houston State Teachers College (now known as Sam Houston State University) as a member of the Lone Star Conference (LSC)  during the 1948 college football season. Led by eighth-year head coach Puny Wilson, the Bearkats compiled an overall record of 0–9–1 with a mark of 0–6 in conference play, and finished sixth in the LSC.

Schedule

References

Sam Houston State
Sam Houston Bearkats football seasons
College football winless seasons
Sam Houston State Bearkats football